The Lucas Formation is a geologic formation in Michigan. It preserves fossils dating back to the Devonian period.

Fossil content

References

 

Devonian Michigan
Devonian Ohio
Devonian southern paleotemperate deposits